Randallia ornata, known generally as the globose sand crab or purple globe crab, is a species of true crab in the family Leucosiidae. It is found in the East Pacific.

References

Further reading

 

decapods
Articles created by Qbugbot
Crustaceans described in 1840